Gadis Desa (literally Maiden from the Village) is a 1949 comedy from what is now Indonesia written and directed by Andjar Asmara. Starring Basuki Djaelani, Ratna Ruthinah, Ali Joego, and Djauhari Effendi, it follows the romantic hijinks of a village girl who is taken to be a rich man's second wife. The film, produced by a Dutch-run company, is recognised as the first in which future "father of Indonesian film" Usmar Ismail was involved.

Plot
Abu Bakar (Ali Joego) attempts to evict Amat after the latter falls behind on his rent, only to fall in love with Amat's beautiful daughter  Aisah (Ratna Ruthinah). He says that she shall work as his maid, although he intends to make her his second wife. Rusli (Basuki Zaelani), Aisah's cousin and a manservant at Abu Bakar's home, discovers this plan and tells Abu Bakar's wife. Aisah is sent back to her village and Rusli, who has fallen in love with her, proposes.

Production
Gadis Desa was produced by the South Pacific Film Corp (SFPC), a film production house owned and run by the Netherlands Indies Civil Administration, a continuation of the former colonial government of the Dutch East Indies. The film was directed by the former journalist Andjar Asmara, who had worked for SPFC since 1948. The film was adapted from a stage play he had written for the travelling troupe Dardanella in the early 1930s. He brought Usmar Ismail, a young journalist with whom he had previously discussed filmmaking, to the production as an assistant director. The two native men had limited creative input, serving more as acting and dialogue coaches. The Dutch cameraman, AA Denninghoff-Stelling, held more power over the final product.

Gadis Desa starred Ali Joego, Ratna Ruthinah, Basuki Zaelani, and Djauhari Effendi. All had had theatrical experience: Joego had been a member of Dardanella with Andjar, Ruthinah and her husband Zaelani –making their feature film debut – had been members of the Matahari touring troupe, while Djauhari had been active in the theatre during the Japanese occupation beginning seven years earlier.

Release and reception
Gadis Desa was released in 1949, followed by a novelisation in 1950. Although he does not record its box-office performance, the Indonesian film historian Misbach Yusa Biran suggests that the film's dated plot was reflective of a Dutch belief that native audiences would prefer unsophisticated comedy. A 35 mm copy is kept at Sinematek Indonesia.

The film proved Andjar's last as a director; he resigned from SPFC before its next production, Tjitra (1949), and spent the rest of his film career as a screenwriter. Ismail would go on to become two films for SFPC, Tjitra and Harta Karun (1949), and, after the Netherlands recognised Indonesia's independence, he established himself as the "father of Indonesian film" with Darah dan Doa (1950). SPFC would produce four further films before being dissolved in 1949.

Notes

Footnotes

Works cited

 
 

 
 
 
 

 
 
 
 

Films directed by Andjar Asmara
Dutch East Indies films
Indonesian black-and-white films
1949 comedy films
1949 films
Indonesian comedy films